Manmadha Leela Kamaraju Gola is a 1987 Telugu-language fantasy comedy film, produced by M. Satyanarayana Prasad and Y. Rama Koteswara Rao under the Ram Gopal Art Movies banner and directed by Relangi Narasimha Rao. It stars Rajendra Prasad, Chandra Mohan and Kalpana,  with music composed by Vasu Rao.

Plot
Kamaraju (Rajendra Prasad), a playboy, is a disciple of Lord Manmadha (Chandra Mohan) (Cupid), the God of romance whom he can see. Kamaraju discusses with Manmadha his romantic experiences with the girls. Once a man called Pandala Paramasivam (Suthi Veerabhadra Rao) who always goes for betting observes Kamaraju flirting behavior with girls, he insults him before everyone. Here Kamaraju keeps a bit Paramasivam that he will make his daughter Kalpana(ilavarasi) fall in his love and marry her. Kamaraju seeks a lot but fails when Manmadha facilitates him in changing Kalpana's mindset and they get married. After the marriage, a dispute arises between Manmadha & Kamaraju, in the issue of achieving Kalpana's love is their own credit. There onwards, it is a comic tale, Manmadha starts teasing Kamaraju, creates disturbances & disputes in his family life, and separates the wife & husband. The rest of the story is about how Kamaraju gets rid of these problems.

Cast
Rajendra Prasad as Kamaraju
Chandra Mohan as Lord Manmadha
ilavarasi as kalpana
Suthi Veerabhadra Rao as Pandala Paramasivam
Suthi Velu as Sandeham
Nutan Prasad as Kondal Rao
Subhalekha Sudhakar as Anji Babu
Potti Prasad
Srilakshmi 
P. R. Varalakshmi
Y. Vijaya as Srugaram Singaram
Nirmalamma

Soundtrack

Music composed by Vasu Rao. Lyrics were written by Acharya Aatreya.

References

External links

1980s fantasy comedy films
1980s Telugu-language films
Indian fantasy comedy films
Films directed by Relangi Narasimha Rao
1987 comedy films
1987 films